The 2022 Beef. It's What's for Dinner. 300 was the first stock car race of the 2022 NASCAR Xfinity Series and the 41st iteration of the event. The race was held on Saturday, February 19, 2022, in Daytona Beach, Florida at Daytona International Speedway, a 2.5 miles (4.0 km) permanent triangular-shaped superspeedway. The race was run over 120 laps. In a wild ending, Austin Hill, driving for Richard Childress Racing, would win the race under caution, with a major wreck including Jordan Anderson Racing driver Myatt Snider flipping and hitting the catchfence with others involved spinning and hitting parts of Snider's wrecked car. Snider would eventually walk away, unharmed from the incident. The win was Hill's first career NASCAR Xfinity Series win and his first of the season. To fill out the podium, A. J. Allmendinger of Kaulig Racing and Noah Gragson of JR Motorsports would finish second and third, respectively.

Background 

Daytona International Speedway is one of three superspeedways to hold NASCAR races, the other two being Indianapolis Motor Speedway and Talladega Superspeedway. The standard track at Daytona International Speedway is a four-turn superspeedway that is 2.5 miles (4.0 km) long. The track's turns are banked at 31 degrees, while the front stretch, the location of the finish line, is banked at 18 degrees.

Entry list

Practice 
The only 50-minute practice session was held on Friday, February 18, at 4:35 PM EST.

Qualifying 
Qualifying was held on Saturday, February 19, at 11:35 AM EST. Since Daytona International Speedway is a superspeedway, the qualifying system used is a single-car, single-lap system with two rounds. In the first round, drivers have one lap to set a time. The fastest ten drivers from the first round move on to the second round. Whoever sets the fastest time in Round 2 wins the pole.

Race results 
Stage 1 Laps: 30

Stage 2 Laps: 30

Stage 3 Laps: 60

Standings after the race

Drivers' Championship standings

Note: Only the first 12 positions are included for the driver standings.

References 

2022 NASCAR Xfinity Series
NASCAR races at Daytona International Speedway
Beef. It's What's for Dinner. 300
Beef. It's What's for Dinner. 300